Kugah may refer to:
 Kugah, Gilan
 Kugah, Kermanshah